Jam Khaneh (also Romanized as Jām Khāneh) is a village in Kuhdasht-e Sharqi Rural District, in the Central District of Miandorud County, Mazandaran Province, Iran. At the 2006 census, its population was 4,847, in 1,188 families.

References 

Populated places in Miandorud County